Canimals (portmanteau of "can" and "animal") (kaenimeol), also known as Canimals: We Can Do It!, is a live-action/CGI animated hybrid television series by Voozclub Co., Ltd. The main characters are Ato, Mimi, Uly, Fizzy, Nia, Oz, Pow, Toki, and Leon. Internationally, the series has aired in the United Kingdom through CITV and worldwide through ITV Network.

The show has received generally positive reviews with praise going to its novel materials and high-quality production.

Plot 
Canimals are adorable creatures in the form of cylinders that carry colorful cans. Canimals are always interested in what is going on around them and have a lot of questions. They hide in their cans when humans are nearby. Even the most mundane objects hold something different and fascinating for the Canimals.

Characters 
 Ato - A cheerful and adventurous Beagle in a green can. In the episode title cards, he displays the Canimals logo.
 Oz - A clever Turkish Angora in a red can. She frequently gets herself into more trouble than she can manage, but thanks to her intelligence, she can get away with just about anything.
 Uly - A hungry Pug in an orange can. He has a large appetite and will eat just about anything he sets his eyes on.
 Mimi - A sassy poodle in a pink can. She loves doing girly activities usually with the other female Canimals. However, she can also get annoyed easily and has a habit of smacking other Canimals out of the way with her ears.
 Pow - A Great Owl in a light brown can. He can debilitate the other Canimals by shooting laser waves from his eyes. He is capable of carrying others with his claws as can be seen in some episodes.
 Fizzy - A Siamese cat in a blue can. He aspires to live a ninja lifestyle, but everything he does has a tendency to backfire on him.
 Toki - A hyperactive and spontaneous Rabbit in a blue can similar to Fizzy's. He is chock full of energy and loves to hop and dance around, especially if there is music.
 Nia - A timid and childlike Turkish Van in a yellow can. She is easily frightened and prone to tears, and can let out a deafening sonic scream.
 Leon - A Chameleon in a green and yellow can. He has the ability to turn invisible and use his tongue to grab objects or cling to higher places.

Other characters
 Woo-ang - A bull terrier who's always happy-go-lucky.
 Peng and Gwen - A penguin twin brother and sister duo.
 Boco - A giant squirrel who is the leader of the Cocoboses. In the episode "Canned Nuts", he antagonizes Ato, Toki and Nia.
 Cocoboses - Small squirrels who love metal nuts and bolts. 
 Wooga - A gorilla who hates dogs and other kinds of animals, except for cats. Wooga can have a serious temper at times.
 Koby - A turtle who hates spicy food. He is kind, grumpy, furious and happy. He gets nervous sometimes.
 Pip - A black and white cat who is Ato's friend for most of the time. She was nicknamed Mini Pip when Mimi and Nia cared for her. However, she can take on a giant form and antagonize the Canimals.
 Lion De Capri - A hot-tempered lion. He can roar very loudly and has chased the Canimals on one occasion.
 Olive - A unique brown skunk. She falls in love with a sock puppet and farts from the episode "Trash Can".
 Moo - A grizzly bear who chased Ato, Toki and Nia in the episode "Canned Nuts".
 Woong and Ung - A seal twin brother duo.
 Dal- A Dalmatian dog who has three younger relatives called the Dallies.
 Elly - An elephant that loves bubbles and blows them with her trunk from the episode "Bubbles".
 Bebes - are bats in cans.

Episodes 

Season 2
 Ato, Oz, Mimi, Uly and Nia swim in an aquarium with Koby. Ato, Oz, Uly, Mimi, Pow and a new canimal named Elly the elephant blow bubbles, Nia gets stuck in a clay vase, so Ato, Uly, Mimi and Leon try to free her, and Ato, Oz, Mimi, Fizzy and Uly are stranded on a desert island.
 Ato, Oz, Mimi and Wooang make things out of recyclables, Oz, Mimi, Fizzy, Nia and Toki ride a toy plane, Oz, Mimi, Nia, Leon and Uly enjoy a day on a boat and Ato, Oz, Uly and Mimi try to run a kid café for entertaining Dal and her Dallies.
 Ato, Oz, Uly, Mimi, Fizzy, Nia and Leon produce their own movie, Ato, Oz, Uly, Mimi, Fizzy, Nia and Leon solve a mirror mystery, Ato, Fizzy, Nia and Leon play with dominoes and Mimi, Oz, Uly, and Nia make music with raindrops, Woong and Ung like the music.
 Ato, Oz, Mimi and Nia make science experiments, Ato, Mimi, Oz, Uly, Fizzy and Pow have fun with their shadows, Mimi, Nia, Toki, Uly and Pow look at stars through a telescope and Ato, Oz, Mimi and Nia fly kites but Capri does not like that they have kites as well.
 The Canimals protect Christmas presents, Ato, Uly, Mimi, Nia and Pow are scared of Halloween, but they try to enjoy it and Oz helps them, Ato, Oz, Uly, Mimi, Pow, Peng & Gwin bake cookies and Mimi learns a lesson about anger with Nia's help.
 Oz invents a ray gun in her workshop; Fizzy and Leon practice martial arts.
 Fizzy has a standoff over a ball of yarn; Ato's garden yields a crop of fresh carrots.
 Fizzy faces a new martial arts opponent; Uly whips something up in the kitchen.
 Oz tries to tell the squirrels apart; Oz and Nia plan a surprise birthday party for Mimi.
 Mimi's friends throw her an unusual birthday party; Pow eats blueberry seeds.
 Nia befriends a frozen gorilla that is found in Ato's garden.
 The gorilla gets lured back to the jungle by Ato and Oz; Mimi and Nia play hide-and-seek.
 The Canimals join Toki for a dance; Uly gets zapped into Ato's garden.

Development 
The show's creation began in 2006.
Aardman, BRB International and Vooz Club collaborated on the show.
The voice acting was done by Aardman, while the modeling, animation, and sound processing were handled by Vooz Club and BRB International.

Licensing 
BRB International manages all the series’ rights on the Iberian Peninsula.

The series was picked up by Netflix in November 2015, and the entire series was available until June 2019 when it was pulled.

Canal+ managed the series rights In France where it aired on TeleTOON+.

Reception

Viewership 
In South Korea, Canimals was first broadcast on EBS in 2011, and it received a high viewership rating and was well-received throughout the country.

In the United Kingdom, Canimals was a Ratings success. The show achieved a peak viewership of around 153,800 viewers on Feb 4th, 2013 during the after school block. The Show quickly became one of CITV's flagship shows, delivering the second highest average audience viewing figures against competitors in the afternoons. Canimals also delivered the highest average audience viewing figures against competitors in the mornings.

Merchandise

Toys 
For all of Europe, the Japanese toy company Tomy released their Canimals Toys range, which included plushes, toy figures, electronics, arts and crafts, and capsule toys.

Academy Plastic Model Co.,Ltd, A Korean plastic model, chemical, and toy company, Released their line of canimals toys in 2015. Their Line Included Vinyl Figures and Plastic Kits.

Other 
Samsonite, a luggage manufacturer and retailer released their line of Canimals travel luggage in 2012.

Websites

UK website 
On July 7, 2012, the show's website officially launched. Aardman was tasked with creating a website for the series, and the site included clips, games, and downloads. In 2019, the website was shut down.

Apps

Mobile apps 
Between February 1, 2011 and January 18, 2012, Canimals had a slew of mobile apps launched.
By April 19, 2013, the Apps Together had received about 3,800,000 downloads.
These apps (with the exception of Canimals Golf.) were taken down at an unspecified time.

Games

Flash games 
Flash games were available for fans to play on the Canimals website.
Since the website was shut down in 2019, these games are no longer playable.

Facebook games

Cantasia 
Cantasia was a game on the popular social media website Facebook. The game was released sometime in November 2012. The game was developed by online game developer, Playplus. The game put players into the world of canimals and let them create their own Cantasia World. The Game initially Featured one minigame, Canimals Match 3, which was later released as a standout app later that December exclusively on Samsung mobile devices.
The release of the Game was the first time the Canimals brand was brought into the United States.

Awards and nominations 
Canimals won as the best for kids 7–10 at the 2010 Kids' Jury and nominated for the Licensing Challenge in MIPJR 2010.
It was also placed 2nd among more than 1,000 works at MIPCOM Junior 2009 where It won the best animation award.
In 2011, it won the Grand Prize (President Award) at the Korean Content Awards.

Home media releases 
In the UK, ITV Studios Home Entertainment released Volume 1 on 29 January 2011.

See also 
 Pucca (TV series)

References

External links 
 
 
Canimals  on BRB Internacional

2011 British television series debuts
2010s British animated television series
2011 South Korean television series debuts
2010s South Korean animated television series
British children's animated comedy television series
British television series with live action and animation
South Korean children's animated comedy television series
Aardman Animations
ITV children's television shows
Animated television series about mammals
Television series by Aardman Animations